Bookshop may refer to:
 Bookshop (company), an online bookseller supporting independent bookstores
 The UK name for a Bookstore.
 The Bookshop, a 1978 novel by Penelope Fitzgerald
 The Bookshop (film), a 2017 drama film